is a Japanese footballer who plays for Machida Zelvia on loan from Matsumoto Yamaga.

Club statistics
Updated to 23 February 2016.

References

External links

Profile at FC Machida Zelvia

1991 births
Living people
Keio University alumni
Association football people from Tokyo
Japanese footballers
J2 League players
J3 League players
Matsumoto Yamaga FC players
FC Machida Zelvia players
Association football midfielders